Jazmín Chebar (born 1973 in Buenos Aires) is an Argentine fashion designer. Cited as "One of Argentina's top designers", she owns a fashion line of the same name which retails "relaxed and formal clothes in a French-style boutique".

Biography
From her early years, she was introduced to design, fabrics and catwalks as her parents owned the boutique "La Clocharde", a notable fashion landmark in Buenos Aires. After finishing school, Chebar moved to New York City, where she attended Parsons The New School for Design, obtaining degrees in Fashion Design and Fashion Merchandising in 1995. She then worked for Valentino and Donna Karan. Chebar created the costume design for Ashes of Paradise.

In March 1997, she opened her first store in Buenos Aires. Two years later, she opened a second store and began exporting to the United States. In 1999, she was a guest at the Paris Fashion Week. In March 2002, she began an association with the fashion entrepreneur Claudio Drescher; together they prepared a growth plan and a strategy to make the brand a symbol of quality, exclusivity and personality. Considered a "top fashion firm" in Buenos Aires, it has fourteen exclusive stores in other locations, including La Plata, Córdoba, Mendoza, as well as in Chile, Uruguay, Mexico, Paraguay, Peru, and Bolivia.

Reactions
Style Total writes that she "achiev[es] a balance between sophistication and humor which gives her a characteristic unique style", while The Telegraph describes her as "the Stella McCartney of BA".

References

External links
 Official website 
Articles about Jazmín Chebar at La Nación 

1973 births
Living people
People from Buenos Aires
Parsons School of Design alumni
Argentine fashion designers
Argentine women fashion designers
Costume designers